István Oláh (16 December 1926 – 15 December 1985) was a Hungarian military officer and politician, who served as Minister of Defence from 1984 until his death.

Biography 
In 1945, he became a volunteer in the Hungarian People's Army. That same year he joined the Communist Party. In 1949 he graduated from the Kossuth Military Academy. In 1964, he a studied at the Voroshilov Soviet Higher Military Academy. From 1966 to 1973, he rose through the ranks of the Hungarian People's Army. He had been serving as a Deputy Minister of Defense of the Hungarian People's Army since 1966. In 1975, he was made a permanent member of the Central Committee of the Hungarian Socialist Workers Party. He was the Minister of Defense after the removal of Lajos Czinege.

Death 
Oláh died on 15 December 1985, a day before his 59th birthday. He was buried in Kerepesi Cemetery. Conspiracy theories about his death arose has his death occurred at a time when the defense ministers of the Soviet Union, Czechoslovakia and East Germany had also died within the same year. It gave rise to assumptions by the media about a specially held action by the Western special services to eliminate the supporters of a forceful solution to the 1981 Polish hunger demonstrations.

External links
 Magyar Életrajzi Lexikon
 Politika, Serbian newspaper (text in Serbian) on his involvement in 1980 events about the time of death and state funeral of Josip Broz Tito.

References 

1926 births
1985 deaths
People from Hajdú-Bihar County
Members of the Hungarian Socialist Workers' Party
Hungarian soldiers
Defence ministers of Hungary